The Larder River is a river in Timiskaming District, in Northeastern Ontario, Canada. It is in the Saint Lawrence River drainage basin, and flows from its source at Larder Lake in geographic McFadden Township to its mouth as a left tributary of the Blanche River in the municipal township of Evanturel.

Course 
The river begins at the mouth of the Larder Lake (length:  altitude) in the Rattray Township in the Timiskaming District. This lake has the following bays: Southwest Arm, Spoon Bay and Northeast Arm.

The mouth of Larder Lake is located at:
 West of the Ontario - Quebec border;
 Northeast of the mouth of the Larder River (confluence with the Blanche River (Lake Timiskaming);
 Southeast of the village center of Larder Lake, Ontario;
 Northwest of the mouth of the Blanche River (Lake Timiskaming).

Upper Larder River (segment of )

 Southeasterly to the northwestern shore of Raven Lake. Note: The north-east part of Raven Lake receives the waters of Buies Lake, which drains the Quebec lakes in the Montbeillard (a sector of Rouyn-Noranda): Hébert, Dufay (Dufay River and Laberge River), Drapeau, Germain and Durand;
 Southwesterly across the southern portion of Raven Lake (Ontario part);
 South, crossing Corset Lake;
 Southwesterly crossing Ward Lake;
 Southwesterly to the easterly limit of the Township Municipality of Larder Lake;
 Southwesterly in the township municipality of Larder Lake across the upper (northeastern) portion of Skead Lake to the north boundary of Bayly Township;
 southwesterly in Bayly Township across upper Skead Lake to First Falls Falls.

Lower part of the Larder River (segment of )

 Southwesterly, crossing the lower Skead Lake;
 Westerly across Wendigo Lake in the Sand Ridge to the eastern limit of Marter Township;
 in Marter Township with  heading west through the Wendigo Falls and Fourth Falls, then  southwesterly, in "Teddy's Falls", "Court Rapids" and "Garnett's Rapids", to the northerly limit of the township municipality of Evanturel;
 Southwesterly in the township municipality of Evanturel snaking to its mouth. The mouth of the Larder River flows over the north-east of the Blanche River (Lake Timiskaming) into the Timiskaming District. This confluence is located at:
 Southwest of the border Ontario-Quebec;
 Northeast of the village center of Englehart, Ontario;
 Northwest of the mouth of the Blanche River (Lake Timiskaming).

The Blanche River flows via Lake Timiskaming and the Ottawa River to the Saint Lawrence River.

References

See also 
List of rivers of Ontario

Rivers of Timiskaming District